Ekko may refer to:

 Ekko Records, independent record label
 Ekkofestival, Norwegian music festival
 Mikky Ekko, American singer-songwriter
 "Ekko", brand name for medication Phenytoin
 Ekko, the Boy Who Shattered Time, a character in League of Legends

See also

 Echo (disambiguation)
 Ecco (disambiguation)
 Eco (disambiguation)
 Eko (disambiguation)
 
 Eckō Unltd., a clothing brand
 EKCO, a British electronics company